This article encompasses the 1880s Pacific typhoon seasons.

1880 season 

There were 3 typhoons in the Western Pacific in 1880.

1881 season 

There were 22 tropical cyclones in the Western Pacific in 1881, 21 of which intensified into typhoons.

In October, a powerful typhoon hit what is now the Philippines, before curving around Hainan Island and devastating Haiphong, Vietnam. Up to 300,000 people were killed by the typhoon, tying it for the tied second deadliest tropical cyclone on record. With 20,000 fatalities in the Philippines, the typhoon is also the deadliest there on record.

1882 season 
There were 12 tropical cyclones in the Western Pacific in 1882, 11 of which intensified into typhoons.

1883 season 
There were 16 tropical cyclones in the Western Pacific in 1883, 15 of which intensified into typhoons.

1884 season 

There were 14 tropical cyclones in the Western Pacific in 1884.

1885 season 

There were 9 tropical cyclones in the Western Pacific in 1885.

1886 season 

There were 15 tropical cyclones in the Western Pacific in 1886.

1887 season 

There were 21 tropical cyclones in the Western Pacific in 1887.

1888 season 

There were 13 tropical cyclones in the Western Pacific in 1888.

1889 season 

There were 12 tropical cyclones in the Western Pacific in 1889.

References 

 
Pacific typhoons
Pacific typhoons
Pacific typhoons
Pacific typhoons